Kicchu is a 2018 Indian Kannada-language thriller drama film starring Dhruva Sharma, Suchendra Prasad, Abhinaya and Ragini Dwivedi. The film is an adaptation of Pradeep Raj's novel Hotti Uriva Kichchinalli. The film notably stars two speech and hearing impaired persons in the lead (Sharma and Abhinaya).

Cast 
Dhruva Sharma as Suri
Suchendra Prasad as Devanna
Abhinaya
Ragini Dwivedi
P. Sai Kumar as Police officer
Pradeep Raj
Sudeepa in cameo role

Production 
The film was shot in Malenadu. Ragini Dwivedi played a deglam role for the first time in her career.

Reception 
A critic from The New Indian Express opined that "Kicchu gives an insight into deforestation, and its effects on people, but somehow, on the whole, a sensitive subject like this one seems to lack depth". Guruprasad D. M. of Deccan Herald wrote that "Even with good intentions, Kicchu is dull, cliched and too flat on emotions". Sunayana Suresh of The Times of India rated the film 3 out of 5 and stated that "Kichchu might not be a drama that keeps you in the edge of your seat, but it has its heart set in the right place".

References

Indian drama films
Films directed by Pradeep Raj